Terell Stafford (born November 25, 1966) is a professional jazz trumpet player and current Director of Jazz Studies at the Boyer College of Music and Dance at Temple University.

Terell Stafford was born in Miami, Florida, and raised in both Chicago, Illinois, and Silver Spring, Maryland. He went on to get a degree in music education from University of Maryland in 1988 and a degree in classical trumpet performance from Rutgers University in 1993. Originally a classical trumpet player, Stafford soon branched out to jazz with the University of Maryland jazz band.

His career in jazz soon picked up and has played with McCoy Tyner, Christian McBride, John Clayton, Steve Turre, Dave Valentin, and Russell Malone and on stages such as Carnegie Hall and The Tonight Show with Jay Leno. He recently released a CD entitled New Beginnings featuring a number of other new up-and-coming musicians such as bassist Derrick Hodge.

In addition to his position at Temple, Stafford has also worked with the Juilliard School's jazz program, at the Lincoln Center's Essentially Ellington program, and with the 2006 All-Alaska Jazz Band.

Discography

As leader

Time To Let Go (Candid, 1995)
Centripetal Force (Candid, 1996)
Gentle Warrior (Criss Cross Jazz, 1997)
Fields of Gold (Nagel Heyer, 2000) – recorded in 1999
New Beginnings (Maxjazz, 2003)
Taking Chances: Live at the Dakota (Maxjazz, 2005)
Bridging the Gap (Planet Arts, 2009) 
This Side of Strayhorn (Maxjazz, 2011)
Brotherlee Love (Capri, 2015).                                                                              
Forgive and Forget (Herb Harris Music, 2016).
Family Feeling (BCM&D Records, 2018).

As sideman

With Arkadia Jazz All Stars
Thank You, Joe (Arkadia Jazz, 1999)
With Bruce Barth
East and West (Maxjazz, 2001)
With Cecil Brooks III
Neck Peckin' Jammie (Muse, 1993)
With Marc Cary
Listen (Arabesque, 1996)
With Jack Cooper and the DoAM Jazz Orchestra
Mists: Charles Ives for Jazz Orchestra (Planet Arts, 2014)
With Cornell Dupree
Bop'n Blues (Kokopelli, 1995)
With Lafayette Harris, Jr.
Lafayette Is Here! (Muse, 1992)
With Victor Lewis
Eeeyyess! (Enja, 1996)
With Herbie Mann 
America/Brazil (Lightyear, 1995)
With Ferit Odman
Dameronia With Strings (Equinox, 2015)
Autumn in New York (Equinox, 2011)
With Houston Person
Moment to Moment (HighNote, 2010)
With Shirley Scott
A Walkin' Thing (Candid, 1992)
With Stephen Scott
Aminah's Dream (Verve, 1992)
With Melissa Walker
May I Feel (Enja, 1997)
With Tim Warfield
A Cool Blue (Criss Cross, 1994)
A Whisper in the Midnight (Criss Cross, 1995)
With Bobby Watson
Tailor Made (Columbia, 1992)
Midwest Shuffle (Columbia, 1993)
With Ed Wiley 
In Remembrance (Swing, 1995)
With Gerald Wilson
Monterey Moods (Mack Avenue, 2007)

External links
Official site
AllAboutJazz.com writeup
JazzTrumpetSolos.com biography

American jazz trumpeters
American male trumpeters
Living people
Temple University faculty
Musicians from Philadelphia
1966 births
Candid Records artists
21st-century trumpeters
Jazz musicians from Pennsylvania
21st-century American male musicians
American male jazz musicians
21st-century African-American musicians
20th-century African-American people